Unloved is an American alternative music trio formed in Los Angeles in 2015, by the American musician Jade Vincent and Keefus Ciancia, and the Northern Irish musician, David Holmes. Songs from their 2016 debut album Guilty of Love and 2019 follow-up album Heartbreak were used as the basis of the soundtrack to the BBC America television series Killing Eve (2018–2022). Ciancia and Holmes also provided original material for the soundtrack, for which they won the 2019 BAFTA TV Craft Award for Original Music.

Discography

Studio albums
Guilty of Love (2016)
Heartbreak (2019)
The Pink Album (2022)
Polychrome (2023)

Singles and EPs
Guilty of Love (2015)
When a Woman is Around (2016)
This is the Time (2016)
Heartbreak (2018)
Strange Effect (2020)

References

External links 
 

Musical groups from Los Angeles
Musical groups established in 2015
Heavenly Recordings artists
2015 establishments in California